Dhaka-17 is a constituency represented in the Jatiya Sangsad (National Parliament) of Bangladesh since 2019 by Akbar Hossain Pathan Farooque of the Awami League.

Boundaries 
The constituency encompasses Dhaka Cantonment and Dhaka North City Corporation wards 15 and 18 through 20.

History 
The constituency was created when, ahead of the 2008 general election, the Election Commission redrew constituency boundaries to reflect population changes revealed by the 2001 Bangladesh census. The 2008 redistricting added 7 new seats to the Dhaka metropolitan area, increasing the number of constituencies in the capital from 8 to 15.

Members of Parliament 
Key

Elections

Election 2018

General Election 2014

Elections in the 2000s

References

External links
 

Parliamentary constituencies in Bangladesh
Dhaka District